The Fight is a 2020 American documentary film directed and produced by Eli Despres, Josh Kriegman and Elyse Steinberg. Kerry Washington serves as a producer under her Simpson Street banner. It follows legal battles that lawyers for the American Civil Liberties Union (ACLU) are facing during the Trump administration.

It had its world premiere at the Sundance Film Festival on January 24, 2020, where it won the U.S. Documentary Special Jury Award for Social Impact Filmmaking. It was released on July 31, 2020, by Magnolia Pictures.

Premise
The film follows five legal battles brought by the American Civil Liberties Union (ACLU) against various Trump administration policies. The lawsuits regard: 
 Opposition to the Trump travel ban, brought by Lee Gelernt
 Pursuit of abortion access for immigrants in ICE custody, brought by Brigitte Amiri
 A challenge to the proposed citizenship question on the census, brought by Dale Ho
 Rejection of the Trump order banning transgender personnel in the military, brought by Chase Strangio
 An attempt to reunite families separated at the border, brought by Lee Gelernt

Release
The film had its world premiere at the Sundance Film Festival on January 24, 2020. Shortly after, Magnolia Pictures acquired distribution rights to the film. It was released in the United States on July 31, 2020.

Critical reception
The website's critics consensus reads: "The Fight takes an engaging look at some of the people working on the front lines for the ACLU -- and makes a passionate case for the legal battles they wage." On Metacritic, the film holds a rating of 73 out of 100, based on 23 critics, indicating "generally favorable reviews".

At the 2020 Sundance Film Festival, the film won the U.S. Documentary Special Jury Award for Social Impact Filmmaking.

References

External links
 
 
 

2020 films
2020 documentary films
American documentary films
Documentary films about lawyers
Documentary films about human rights
Sundance Film Festival award winners
Topic Studios films
2020s English-language films
2020s American films